Empirical Methods in Natural Language Processing (EMNLP) is a leading conference in the area of natural language processing and artificial intelligence. Along with the Association for Computational Linguistics (ACL), it is one of the two primary high impact conferences for natural language processing research. EMNLP is organized by the ACL special interest group on linguistic data (SIGDAT) and was started in 1996, based on an earlier conference series called Workshop on Very Large Corpora (WVLC).

, according to Microsoft Academic, EMNLP is the 14th most cited conference in computer science, with a citation count of 332,738, between ICML (#13) and ICLR (#15).

Locations
  EMNLP 2022, Abu Dhabi, United Arab Emirates (Hybrid)
  EMNLP 2021, Punta Cana, Dominican Republic or online
  EMNLP 2020, Punta Cana, Dominican Republic (virtual conference due to COVID-19)
  EMNLP 2019, Hong Kong, China
  EMNLP 2018, Brussels, Belgium
  EMNLP 2017, Copenhagen, Denmark
  EMNLP 2016, Austin, Texas, United States
  EMNLP 2015, Lisbon, Portugal
  EMNLP 2014, Doha, Qatar
  EMNLP 2013, Seattle, Washington, United States
  EMNLP 2012, Jeju Island, South Korea
  EMNLP 2011, Edinburgh, United Kingdom
  EMNLP 2010, Cambridge, Massachusetts, United States
  EMNLP 2009, Singapore
  EMNLP 2008, Honolulu, Hawaii, United States
  EMNLP 2007, Prague, Czech Republic
  EMNLP 2006, Sydney, Australia

References

Computer science conferences
Natural language processing